Karl Böhm (1894–1981) was an Austrian conductor.

Karl Böhm may also refer to:

 Karl Böhm (art director) (1882–1942), German art director
 Karl Bohm (footballer) (born 1995), Swedish footballer
 Karl Ewald Böhm (1913–1977), East German writer
 Karlheinz Böhm (1928–2014), sometimes referred to as Karl Boehm, Austrian-German actor and philanthropist